The 2016–17 Army Black Knights men's basketball team represented the United States Military Academy during the 2016–17 NCAA Division I women's basketball season. The Black Knights, led by eleventh year head coach Dave Magarity, played their home games at Christl Arena and were members of the Patriot League. They finished the season 22–9, 12–6 in Patriot League play to finish in third place. They advanced to the semifinals of the Patriot League women's tournament where they lost to Navy. Despite having 22 wins, they missed the postseason tournament for the first time since 2014.

Roster

Schedule

|-
!colspan=9 style="background:#000000; color:#D6C499;"| Non-conference regular season

|-
!colspan=9 style="background:#000000; color:#D6C499;"| Patriot League regular season

|-
!colspan=9 style="background:#000000; color:#D6C499;"| Patriot League Women's Tournament

Rankings
2016–17 NCAA Division I women's basketball rankings

See also
2016–17 Army Black Knights men's basketball team

References

Army
Army Black Knights women's basketball seasons
2016 in sports in New York (state)
2017 in sports in New York (state)